The Kauffman's Distillery Covered Bridge or Sporting Hill Bridge is a covered bridge that spans Chiques Creek in Lancaster County, Pennsylvania, United States. A county-owned and maintained bridge, its official designation is the Big Chiques #1 Bridge. (Chiques Creek was known as Chickies Creek until 2002)

The bridge has a single span, wooden, double Burr arch trusses design with the addition of steel hanger rods. The deck is made from oak planks.  It is painted red, the traditional color of Lancaster County covered bridges, on both the inside and outside. Both approaches to the bridge are painted in the traditional white color.

The bridge's WGCB Number is 38-36-32. In 1980 it was added to the National Register of Historic Places as structure number 80003529. It is located at  (40.14817, -76.40983).

History 
Kauffman's Distillery Covered Bridge was originally built in 1857 at a cost of $1,185 by James C. Carpenter. The bridge was named after the Kauffman's Distillery Mill which operated in the late 1800s. In 1874 the bridge was rebuilt by Elias McMellen at a cost of $1,620.

Dimensions 

Length:  span and  total length
Width:  clear deck and  total width
Overhead clearance: 
Underclearance:

Gallery

See also
Burr arch truss
List of Lancaster County covered bridges

References 

Covered bridges in Lancaster County, Pennsylvania
Bridges completed in 1857
Bridges completed in 1874
Covered bridges on the National Register of Historic Places in Pennsylvania
National Register of Historic Places in Lancaster County, Pennsylvania
Road bridges on the National Register of Historic Places in Pennsylvania
1857 establishments in Pennsylvania
Wooden bridges in Pennsylvania
Burr Truss bridges in the United States